(also written 2016 NL56) is a near-Earth object (NEO) and a potentially hazardous object (PHA), meaning that it has an orbit that can make close approaches to the Earth and large enough to cause significant regional damage in the event of impact. It is an Apollo asteroid, meaning that it is an Earth-crossing asteroid that has an orbit larger than the orbit of the Earth. It was first observed on 12 July 2016, when the asteroid was more than 1 AU from Earth and had a solar elongation of 163 degrees.

With additional observations recovered dating back as far as August 2001, the object's previously short observation arc of 2.8 days has been extended to almost 20 years, and its roughly calculated orbit has become secure with an uncertainty parameter of 1. It orbits the Sun at a distance of 0.6–2.2 AU once every 20 months (609 days; semi-major axis of 1.41 AU). Its orbit has a high eccentricity of 0.54 and an inclination of 5° with respect to the ecliptic.

This asteroid has been in both the Risk List of the European Space Agency (ESA) - Space Situational Awareness (SSA) and in the Sentry List of the Jet Propulsion Laboratory (JPL) - Center for Near Earth Object Studies (CNEOS). On 21 July 2021, this object was removed from the Sentry List, where it was previously listed with the highest Palermo Technical Impact Hazard Scale value due to a possible close encounter with Earth on 5 September 2024.

See also

References

External links 
 
 
 

Minor planet object articles (unnumbered)

Potentially hazardous asteroids
Potential impact events caused by near-Earth objects
20160712